Canley Vale railway station is located on the Main South line, serving the Sydney suburb of Canley Vale. It is served by Sydney Trains T2 Inner West & Leppington Line and T5 Cumberland line services.

History
Canley Vale station opened in April 1878. Canley Vale station is included in the NSW Governments Station Accessibility Upgrade Program which will see lifts built onto the current footbridge, toilets, an upgraded station entrance and improvements to CCTV, wayfinding and lighting. The upgrade to Canley Vale was complete in November 2021 and included new lifts and a kiss-and-ride feature.

Platforms & services

Transport links
Transit Systems operate one route via Canley Vale station:
817: Cabramatta station and Fairfield station

Canley Vale station is served by one NightRide route:
N50: Liverpool station to Town Hall station

References

External links

Canley Vale station details Transport for New South Wales

Railway stations in Sydney
Railway stations in Australia opened in 1878
Main Southern railway line, New South Wales
City of Fairfield